Cooper Austin Hjerpe (born March 16, 2001) is an American professional baseball pitcher in the St. Louis Cardinals organization. He was selected 22nd overall by the Cardinals in the 2022 Major League Baseball draft.

Amateur career
Hjerpe attended Woodland High School in Woodland, California, a city northwest of Sacramento. He committed to play college baseball at Oregon State University as a sophomore. As a junior in 2018, he went 8–0 with a 0.78 ERA and 128 strikeouts over  innings alongside hitting eight home runs. In 2019, as a senior, he struck out 105 batters in 44 innings and threw four no-hitters. He went unselected in the 2019 Major League Baseball draft and enrolled at Oregon State to play collegiate baseball.

In 2020, Hjerpe's freshman year at Oregon State, he made six relief appearances and went 1–1 with a 5.25 ERA before the season was cancelled due to the COVID-19 pandemic. As a redshirt freshman in 2021, he was named the Pac-12 Pitcher of the Week as well as the National Player of the Week by Collegiate Baseball Newspaper on May 24 after he gave up one run and two hits while striking out 11 in a 3–1 win versus the seventh-ranked Arizona Wildcats. For the season, he pitched in 17 games (making 16 starts) and went 3–6 with a 4.21 ERA and 98 strikeouts over 77 innings.

Hjerpe entered the 2022 season as Oregon State's number one starter and garnered numerous preseason All-American honors. On March 22, he was named Pac-12 Pitcher of the Week for the second time in his career after pitching seven innings and giving up one hit while striking out 12 in a 21–0 win versus the Arizona State Sun Devils. On April 1, in a 1–0 loss versus the Stanford Cardinal, Hjerpe threw eight scoreless innings and struck out 17 batters, tied for the most in school history, and was once again named Pac-12 Pitcher of the Week and National Player of the Week by Collegiate Baseball Newspaper. At the end of the regular season, he was named to the Pac-12 First Team as well as being named an All American. Hjerpe was scheduled to start the first game of Oregon State's Super Regional versus Auburn University, but was scratched due to an undisclosed illness. He pitched in Game 2 of the Super Regional and passed former Oregon State pitcher Luke Heimlich for the school record for most strikeouts in a season with 161. Hjerpe finished the 2022 season having started 17 games, going 11–2 with a 2.53 ERA, 161 strikeouts, and 23 walks over  innings. He was named the 2022 National Pitcher of the Year.

Professional career
The St. Louis Cardinals selected Hjerpe in the first round with the 22nd overall selection of the 2022 Major League Baseball draft. He signed with the club for $3.18 million.

Personal life
Hjerpe's father, Carl, played college baseball for the Cal Poly Mustangs in the 1980s.

References

External links
Oregon State Beavers bio

2001 births
Living people
Baseball players from California
Baseball pitchers
Oregon State Beavers baseball players
All-American college baseball players